Gerard Benderoth (February 1, 1969 – March 8, 2017) was an American policeman and strongman.

He was a New York City Police officer for more than a decade, and later a local police officer in Haverstraw, Rockland County, New York. He had vied for years to try to win the title "World's Strongest Man".

Benderoth was also a boxer, his skills qualified him for the 1996 Hudson Valley boxing team at the Empire State Games. In 1995, he was a New York Golden Gloves super heavy weight 220-pound finalist, losing by decision.

He was a football player at North Rockland High School, later attending  Westchester Community College and Troy State in Alabama.

Death
Benderoth died on March 8, 2017, age 48, from a self-inflicted gunshot wound when he was pulled over by FBI agents and local police officers just a short drive from his home. The FBI reportedly planned to arrest Benderoth on a sealed indictment related to the Tartaglione multiple murder and drug conspiracy case.

Personal life
Benderoth lived in Stony Point, Rockland County, New York, with his wife and four children.

Achievements

 2006 - America's Strongest Man 13th
 2007 - America's Strongest Man 14th
 2008 - America's Strongest Man 10th

References

1969 births
2017 deaths

American strength athletes
New York City Police Department officers
Place of birth missing
People from Haverstraw, New York
People from Stony Point, New York
Suicides by firearm in New York (state)